Schwerner is a surname. Notable people with the surname include:

 Armand Schwerner (1927–1999), American poet
 Michael Schwerner (1939–1964), civil-rights activist murdered in Philadelphia, Mississippi
 Rita Schwerner Bender (born 1942), civil rights activist and lawyer, wife of Michael Schwerner

Jewish surnames
German-language surnames